Raissac-d'Aude is a commune in the Aude department in southern France.

Geography
The river Orbieu forms all of the commune's eastern border, then flows into the Aude, which forms all of its northern border.

Population

See also
Communes of the Aude department

References

Communes of Aude
Aude communes articles needing translation from French Wikipedia